Pantepec is a town and one of the 119 municipalities of Chiapas, in southern Mexico. The Chiapas Zoque language is spoken in this municipality.

As of 2010, the municipality had a total population of 10,870, up from 8,566 as of 2005. It covers an area of 47.2 km².

As of 2010, the town of Pantepec had a population of 1,820. Other than the town of Pantepec, the municipality had 54 localities, the largest of which (with 2010 populations in parentheses) was: San Isidro las Banderas (1,309), classified as rural.

References

Municipalities of Chiapas